The Knife is the debut studio album by Swedish electronic music duo the Knife, released on 5 February 2001 by Rabid Records. The album's recordings started early in the summer of 1999 in a cottage on the Swedish island of Tjörn. The duo also recorded it in their flats in Gothenburg and Stockholm, and in a rehearsal studio in the Hökarängen district of Stockholm.

On 31 October 2006, Mute Records released this and the Knife's second album, Deep Cuts, in the United States, marking the first Stateside release of both titles.

Track listing

The Knife 10-inch

The UK release of the album was preceded, on 23 February 2004, by the release of a limited-edition 10-inch EP also titled The Knife. The track listing was as follows:

A1. "Kino"
A2. "Bird"
B1. "N.Y. Hotel"
B2. "High School Poem"

Personnel
Credits adapted from the liner notes of The Knife.

 The Knife – recording, production, mixing, accordion, alto saxophone, electric guitar, acoustic guitar, bass guitar, organ, synthesisers, drum machine, sampling, drum programming, vocals, cover design
 Henrik Jonsson – mastering
 Albin Lindblad – handclapping

Release history

References

External links
 

2001 debut albums
The Knife albums
Mute Records albums
V2 Records albums